Bohunt Horsham is a coeducational all-through school located in Horsham, West Sussex, England. The school opened to 120 students in Year 7 in 2019 in the centre of Horsham whilst a new, purpose-built school is currently in development North of the town.  Eventually the school will take 1620 students from ages 4–16, and will include a nursery with provision for 50 places.  Bohunt School Horsham is funded by the Department for Education as a free school. The school is sponsored by the Bohunt Education Trust, led by Bohunt School in Liphook, Hampshire.

Opening in 2019 & Temporary Site 
The new school is the third newly opened school by the Bohunt Education Trust. It opened in a temporary site in Hurst Road, Horsham in September 2019, with 120 students joining in the first year. The trust announced the Head Teacher in November 2018.

Permanent Site 
The school has now however relocated to the north of the town on Rusper Road in 2022. This comes of a wider development of the area with the addition of up to 2,750 homes, a business park, and sports facilities.

References

External links 
 

Primary schools in West Sussex
Secondary schools in West Sussex
Free schools in England
Educational institutions established in 2019
2019 establishments in England